Shane Michael Wiskus (born October 1, 1998) is an American artistic gymnast who represented the United States at the 2020 Summer Olympics.  Additionally, he represented the United States at the 2019 World Championships and is a three-time NCAA Champion.

Personal life 
Wiskus was born in Waconia, Minnesota on October 1, 1998 to Tammy and Mike Wiskus.  His sister, Annabelle, has performed with the Minnesota Association of Dance Teams.

In 2002, Wiskus's mother signed him up for gymnastics classes to develop his coordination and motor skills.  He began competing three years later at age seven.

Wiskus studied business and marketing at the University of Minnesota in Minneapolis, USA. While competing with the university, he was named Big Ten Gymnast of the Year twice, 2018 Big Ten Conference Freshman of the Year, and the 2020 College Gymnastics Association Most Valuable Player. In 2021, he received the Nissan-Emery Award as the top collegiate male gymnast in the United States of America. When the University of Minnesota announced they would discontinue their gymnastics program after the 2020–2021 school year, Wiskus moved to Colorado to train at the US Olympic & Paralympic Training Center to prepare for the 2020 Summer Olympics in Tokyo.

Gymnastics career

Junior

2014–15 
Wiskus competed at his first elite-level National Championships in 2014 where he finished 11th in the all-around and fourth on floor exercise.  At the 2015 National Championships Wiskus placed second in the all-around behind Davis Grooms.  Additionally he placed first on rings, second on floor exercise, and third on parallel bars.  Wiskus was later selected to represent the USA at the Olympic Hopes Cup in Liberec.  While there Wiskus helped the USA placed third and individually he placed third in the all-around.

2016 
In early 2016 Wiskus competed at the RD761 International Junior Team Cup where he helped his team finish third.  At the 2016 National Championships Wiskus won his first national all-around title.  Additionally he won gold on four of the six apparatuses (floor exercise, vault, parallel bars, and horizontal bars) and won silver on pommel horse and rings.

Senior

2017–18 
Wiskus turned senior in 2017.  He competed at the 2017 Winter Cup where he finished 11th in the all-around.  He next competed at the University of Calgary International Cup where he helped USA finish second behind China.  Individually he won gold in the all-around.  At the 2017 U.S. National Championships Wiskus finished 13th in the all-around.

In 2018 Wiskus began competing with the Minnesota Golden Gophers.  In February he competed at the 2018 Winter Cup where he placed ninth in the all-around and won silver on floor exercise behind Sam Mikulak.  At the 2018 NCAA National Championships Wiskus helped Minnesota finish second as a team and individually he won silver in the all-around behind Yul Moldauer.  At the U.S. National Championships Wiskus placed 19th in the all-around.

2019 
Wiskus competed at the Winter Cup Challenge and placed 27th in the all-around.    At the NCAA National Championships Wiskus placed second in the all-around behind Brody Malone.  He won his first NCAA title on the parallel bars and placed sixth on vault and ninth on horizontal bar.

At the 2019 U.S. National Championships Wiskus finished fourth in the all-around but won the national title on vault.  He competed at the World Team selection trials where he placed third in the all-around behind Sam Mikulak and Akash Modi.  He was added to team alongside Mikulak, Modi, Yul Moldauer, and Trevor Howard.  At the World Championships Wiskus helped team USA finish fourth.

2020 
Wiskus competed at the 2020 Winter Cup where he placed second in the all-around and on high bar.  He next competed at the American Cup where he placed fourth behind compatriot Sam Mikulak, Ukrainian Oleg Vernyayev, and James Hall of Great Britain.  Wiskus' junior NCAA season was cut short due to the ongoing COVID-19 pandemic and the NCAA Championships were canceled.  In late 2020 Wiskus competed at the Friendship & Solidarity Meet where he was on the Friendship Team who placed second.

2021 

Wiskus returned to competition at the 2021 Winter Cup where he placed fourth in the all-around but won gold on floor exercise.  At the NCAA Championships Wiskus once again place second in the all-around behind Brody Malone.  However he placed first on both rings and parallel bars and placed second on floor exercise and horizontal bar.  Wiskus was awarded the 2021 Nissen Emery Award, the highest honor in college men's gymnastics for a senior gymnast.

At the 2021 U.S. National Championships Wiskus placed ninth in the all-around after falling off the horizontal bar three times on night two of the competition.  He was selected to compete at the upcoming Olympic Trials.   At the Olympic Trials Wiskus finished third in the all-around and was named to the team to compete at the 2020 Olympic Games alongside Brody Malone, Yul Moldauer, and Sam Mikulak.

At the Olympic Games qualification, Wiskus finished 21st in the all-around; however he did not advance to the finals due to two-per-country limitations as Malone and Mikulak placed higher.  Additionally he finished ninth on floor exercise and was the first reserve for the final.  During the team final Wiskus helped the United States place fifth.

2022
Wiskus was scheduled to compete at the 2022 Winter Cup but had to withdraw due to a knee injury.  In June Wiskus was selected to represent the United States at the Pan American Championships alongside Riley Loos, Brody Malone, Yul Moldauer, and Colt Walker.  On the first day of competition Wiskus competed on all six events to help qualify the United States in first place to the team final.  During the team final he only competed on parallel bars and horizontal bar to help the USA win gold ahead of the reigning team champion Brazil.

In August Wiskus competed at the U.S. National Championships where he finished seventh in the all-around.  Additionally he placed third on horizontal bar.

Competitive history

References

External links
 
 

1998 births
Living people
Sportspeople from Minneapolis
American male artistic gymnasts
Gymnasts at the 2020 Summer Olympics
Olympic gymnasts of the United States